Frances Foong Chu Yao is a Chinese-born American mathematician and theoretical computer scientist. She is currently a Chair Professor at the Institute for Interdisciplinary Information Sciences (IIIS) of Tsinghua University. She was Chair Professor and Head of the Department of computer science at the City University of Hong Kong, where she is now an honorary professor.

Life 
After receiving a B.S. in mathematics from National Taiwan University in 1969, Yao did her Ph.D. studies under the supervision of Michael J. Fischer at the Massachusetts Institute of Technology, receiving her Ph.D. in 1973. She then held positions at the University of Illinois at Urbana-Champaign, Brown University, and Stanford University, before joining the staff at the Xerox Palo Alto Research Center in 1979 where she stayed until her retirement in 1999.

In 2003, she came out of retirement to become the Head and a Chair Professor of the Department of Computer Science at City University of Hong Kong, which she held until June 2011. She is a Fellow of the American Association for the Advancement of Science; in 1991, she and Ronald Graham won the Lester R. Ford Award of the Mathematical Association of America for their expository article, A Whirlwind Tour of Computational Geometry.

Yao's husband, Andrew Yao, is also a well-known theoretical computer scientist and Turing Award winner.

Much of Yao's research has been in the subject of computational geometry and combinatorial algorithms; she is known for her work with Mike Paterson on binary space partitioning, her work with Dan Greene on finite-resolution computational geometry, and her work with Alan Demers and Scott Shenker on scheduling algorithms for energy-efficient power management.

More recently she has been working in cryptography. Along with her husband Andrew Yao and Wang Xiaoyun, they found new attacks on the SHA-1 cryptographic hash function.

Selected publications
.
.
.
.
.
.
.
.

References

External links

20th-century American mathematicians
20th-century Chinese mathematicians
21st-century American mathematicians
21st-century Chinese mathematicians
American computer scientists
Brown University faculty
Chinese emigrants to the United States
Chinese women computer scientists
Academic staff of the City University of Hong Kong
Fellows of the American Association for the Advancement of Science
Living people
Massachusetts Institute of Technology alumni
National Taiwan University alumni
Researchers in geometric algorithms
Scientists at PARC (company)
Stanford University Department of Computer Science faculty
Academic staff of Tsinghua University
University of Illinois Urbana-Champaign faculty
Year of birth missing (living people)